Tisamenus serratorius is a stick insect species that occurs on the Philippine island Luzon.

Taxonomy 
In 1875, Carl Stål described Tisamenus serratorius in the genus Tisamenus, which he also described, using a female from the collection of Carl Brunner von Wattenwyl. This is today the holotype of the species and is deposited in the Natural History Museum, Vienna. The species name derives from Latin en "serrato "for sawn off and refers to the sawtooth-like reinforced side edges of the thorax. In 1904, William Forsell Kirby established Tisamenus serratorius as the type species species of the genus. In 1939 the genus Tisamenus was synonymized with the genus Hoploclonia, whereby the species initially named as Hoploclonia serratoria and later as Hoploclonia serratorius. At the same time the genus Hoploclonia was divided into different groups according to morphological aspects. In the so-called Serratoria group, they placed with Hoploclonia serratorius, Hoploclonia asper (today Tisamenus asper), Hoploclonia clotho (today Tisamenus clotho) and Hoploclonia atropos (today Tisamenus atropos), relatively strongly spiny species, with clear lateral spines along the edges of the thorax and an isosceles reaching up to about half of the mesonotum triangle on the anterior mesothorax. In 2004 the Filipino species were transferred back to the genus Tisamenus and only those occurring on Borneo were left in the genus Hoploclonia. Tisamenus serratorius got its original name and status back as type species of the genus.

In 2021, a study based on genetic analysis included Tisamenus serratorius from Mount Binangonan in Quezon and turned out to be not conspecific with all other samples examined from the genus. It was also shown that Tisamenus serratorius is not so closely related to Tisamenus clotho that was also examined, as the 1939 grouping suggested.

Description 
On the head there is a pair of spines pointing forward and upward. On the pronotum there are three pairs of clear spines arranged in a group that runs obliquely outwards. On the sides of the elongated mesothorax there are five distinct spines, on its upper side an isosceles triangle formed by raised edges can be found. The base of this triangle is attached to the front edge of the mesonotum, is strongly raised and reinforced with spines at the corners. On the sides of the metathorax there are three spines, the length of which increases from front to back. As an extension of the posterior tip of the triangle from the mesonotum, there is a longitudinal ridge on the metanotum. On this, at the rear edge of the meso- and metanotum, there can be two closely spaced tubercles, which can rarely be formed as short, blunt spines. The abdomen is slender and almost cylindrical. On its first to third and partly fourth segment there is a pair of spines directed obliquely to the side, the length of which decreases from front to back.

The number and arrangement of body structures and spines, with all of the spines being much shorter and blunt. The thorax becomes even wider from the prothorax to the metathorax, just as the abdomen gradually becomes narrower again towards the end, so that the body looks slightly on both sides convex when viewed from above. The abdomen ends in a relatively short ovipositor. Their coloration is significantly more variable than that of the males. In addition to the dominant shades of brown, a contrasting pattern of light beige and black tones is common, especially in freshly adult females. These are more pronounced on the thorax than on the abdomen, which is usually only patterned in brown and black. This drawing loses contrast with age.

Distribution and way of life 
The species is native in the Philippine provinces Quezon and Aurora on the island of Luzon, where it occurs very frequently in places.

The females lay an egg in the ground several times a week. The lid (operculum) sits at an opercular angle of approx. 20 ° on the egg. As with many Obriminae, the micropylar plate forms an upside-down "Y". While the males remain slim and gradually develop their later shape and color in the course of the next molt, the female nymphs become increasingly broader and more contrasting in color until they show their maximum pattern and color variance as subadult animals. Adults of both sexes can live more than a year.

In captivity 
Tisamenus serratorius was the first species of the genus to be found in the terrariums of European enthusiasts. Its first breeding stock was collected in 2009 by Joachim Bresseel and Thierry Heitzmann in the Quezon province on the island of Luzon. Its locations are the Sierra Madre mountains near Real and in Real itself. Bresseel, Rob Krijns and Tim Bollens found more specimens in 2010. The first stock came to Europe as Tisamenus sp. 'Sierra Madre' or Tisamenus sp. 'Real'. The species was later identified by Bresseel as Tisamenus serratorius. The Phasmid Study Group lists them under PSG number 314.

At the end of November 2008, Heitzmann collected a female in the Quezon National Park from which another stock, presumably belonging to this species, can be traced back. This is called Tisamenus sp. 'Quezon National Park' or short Tisamenus serratorius 'QNP' (for Quezon National Park). Bressell, Bollens and Mark Bushell also found other very similar specimens on Luzon near the city San Luis, Aurora in Cunayan. Whether they are still in breeding is just as uncertain as their affiliation to Tisamenus serratorius, as they had more or clearer spines along the middle of the body. They are also named after where they were found and called Tisamenus sp. 'Cunayan'. The Phasmid Study Group has the PSG number 359.

The keeping and breeding of Tisamenus serratorius respectively their stocks is considered simple. They willingly feed on various forage plants such as hazel, bramble and other Rosaceae, but also firethorn and Hypericum. They only need small, moderately moist terrariums with a substrate for laying eggs.

Gallery

References

External links

Phasmatodea
Phasmatodea of Asia
Insects described in 1875